Mohammed Sabir is a British businessperson, chair of the award-winning Aagrah group of restaurants, which is based in Bradford, West Yorkshire.

He was awarded an MBE award in 2006 for his charitable work in West Yorkshire. He was born in Chakswari, Mirpur District, Pakistan.

References

External links
Aagrah Restaurant

Living people
1940s births
British restaurateurs
English people of Mirpuri descent